DQL may refer to:
 DAML+OIL Query Language, an RDF query language.
 Data query language, particularly for SQL.
 Doctrine Query Language, for Doctrine (PHP).

Query languages